Frank Knox Morton Rehn (April 12, 1848 – July 7, 1914) was an American marine painter and president of the Salmagundi Club. Born in Philadelphia, he attended the Pennsylvania Academy of the Fine Arts, where he studied under Christian Schussele. For several years, he then painted portraits in Philadelphia.  Using money earned in Philadelphia, he moved to the coast of New Jersey, where he began doing marine paintings. In 1881, he married Margaret Selby.  They moved to the Hotel Chelsea in New York City where, with other artists, he kept a studio on the top floor.

In 1882, he was awarded the first prize for marine painting at the St. Louis Exposition. In 1885, he received the first prize at the water color exhibition of the American Art Association, and in 1886 he won a gold medal at the Prize Fund Exhibition.

Rehn died on July 7, 1914 in Magnolia, Massachusetts, where he had built a summer home in 1896.

Works
 "Looking down on the Sea from the Rocks at Magnolia, Mass." (1884–85)
 "A Missing Vessel" (Detroit Institute of Arts; 1885)
 "Close of a Summer Day" (Buffalo Fine Arts Academy; 1887)
 "Evening, Gloucester Harbor" (1887)
 "In the Glittering Moonlight" (Corcoran Gallery)

References

External links

Exhibition of Landscapes, an exhibition catalog available from The Metropolitan Museum of Art Libraries.

1848 births
1914 deaths
Pennsylvania Academy of the Fine Arts alumni
19th-century American painters
19th-century American male artists
American male painters
20th-century American painters
Members of the Salmagundi Club
American marine artists
Artists from Philadelphia
20th-century American male artists